Dominik Schwizer (born 25 June 1996) is a Swiss footballer who plays for Lausanne-Sport.

Career

Thun
Schwizer joined FC Thun in January 2018. In the summer 2019, Schwizer was loaned out to FC Vaduz for the 2019/20 season.

Lausanne-Sport
On 7 June 2022, Schwizer moved to Lausanne-Sport.

References

External links
 Dominik Schwizer at FC Vaduz' website

1996 births
Sportspeople from the canton of St. Gallen
Living people
Swiss men's footballers
Association football midfielders
FC Rapperswil-Jona players
FC Thun players
FC Vaduz players
FC Lausanne-Sport players
Swiss expatriate footballers
Swiss expatriate sportspeople in Liechtenstein
Expatriate footballers in Liechtenstein
Swiss Promotion League players
Swiss Super League players
Swiss Challenge League players
Swiss 1. Liga (football) players